Edward Miles may refer to:

 Edward Miles (painter) (1752–1828), English miniature painter
 Edward David Miles (1845–1922), Australian businessman and politician, member of the Queensland Legislative Council
 Edward Miles (politician) (1849–1944), Australian businessman and politician, member of the Tasmanian Parliament